Orup is the debut studio album by Swedish musician Orup, released on 11 January 1988.

Track listing 

All songs written by Orup, except where noted.

Charts

Certifications and sales

References

External links 

 

1988 debut albums
Orup albums
Warner Music Group albums